In many Methodist Churches, a District Conference is a unit of church organisation with respect to hierarchy.

Evangelical Wesleyan Church
In the Evangelical Wesleyan Church, district conferences are required to be held thrice a year. It is presided over by a bishop. It grants and renews licenses to preach, recommends suitable local preachers to the annual conference, recommends suitable deaconesses to the annual conference, among other responsibilities.

Primitive Methodist Church
In the Primitive Methodist Church, a district superintendent presides over the district conference.

United Methodist Church
In the United Methodist Church, district conferences consist of clergy from the district, as well as lay delegates from each pastoral charge. It is presided over by a District Superintendent.

See also 
 Conferences in Methodism
 Annual conference
 General Conference (Methodism)

References

Church organization
Dioceses by denomination
Methodism
Districts